Craig Weldon (born 5 July 1960) is a Canadian judoka. He competed in the men's half-lightweight event at the 1988 Summer Olympics.

References

External links
 

1960 births
Living people
Canadian male judoka
Olympic judoka of Canada
Judoka at the 1988 Summer Olympics
Sportspeople from Scarborough, Toronto